German submarine U-359 was a Type VIIC U-boat of Nazi Germany's Kriegsmarine during World War II.

She carried out three patrols. She did not sink or damage any ships.

She was sunk by an American aircraft in the Caribbean Sea on 26 July 1943.

Design
German Type VIIC submarines were preceded by the shorter Type VIIB submarines. U-359 had a displacement of  when at the surface and  while submerged. She had two shafts and two  propellers.

U-359 was fitted with five  torpedo tubes (four fitted at the bow and one at the stern), fourteen torpedoes, one  SK C/35 naval gun, 220 rounds, and two twin  C/30 anti-aircraft guns. The boat had a complement of between forty-four and sixty.

Service history
The submarine was laid down on 9 June 1941 at the Flensburger Schiffbau-Gesellschaft yard at Flensburg as yard number 478, launched on 11 June 1942 and commissioned on 5 October under the command of Oberleutnant zur See Heinz Förster.

She served with the 8th U-boat Flotilla from 5 October 1942 and the 7th flotilla from 1 March 1943.

First patrol
U-359s first patrol took her from Kiel on 4 February 1943, through the Iceland / Faroe Islands 'gap' and south of Greenland. She arrived at St. Nazaire in occupied France, on 18 March.

Second patrol
During her second foray she crossed the Bay of Biscay and then turned in a southwesterly direction. The boat accordingly headed south before sailing northwest across the Atlantic.

Third patrol and loss
U-359 left St. Nazaire for the last time on 29 June 1943. On 26 July, she was sunk by depth charges dropped from a US Navy PBM Mariner aircraft in the Caribbean off Santo Domingo, Haiti.

47 men died; there were no survivors.

Previously recorded fate
U-359 was originally noted as sunk on 28 July 1943 by a Mariner aircraft P-1 of USN Squadron VP-32. (Postwar assessment). This attack sank .

Wolfpacks
U-359 took part in seven wolfpacks, namely:
 Neptun (18 – 28 February 1943) 
 Wildfang (28 February – 5 March 1943) 
 Westmark (6 – 11 March 1943) 
 Amsel (26 April – 3 May 1943) 
 Amsel 4 (3 – 6 May 1943) 
 Rhein (7 – 10 May 1943) 
 Elbe 2 (10 – 12 May 1943)

References

Bibliography

External links

German Type VIIC submarines
U-boats commissioned in 1942
U-boats sunk in 1943
U-boats sunk by US aircraft
U-boats sunk by depth charges
1942 ships
Ships built in Flensburg
World War II submarines of Germany
Ships lost with all hands
World War II shipwrecks in the Caribbean Sea
Maritime incidents in July 1943